Esperiana daudebartii is a species of a freshwater snail with an operculum, an aquatic gastropod mollusk in the family Melanopsidae.

Subspecies
Subspecies within this species include:
 Esperiana daudebartii acicularis (A. Férussac, 1823)
 Esperiana daudebartii daudebartii (Prevost, 1821)

Esperiana daudebartii acicularis

Synonyms:
 Microcolpia acicularis (Férussac, 1823)
 Fagotia daudebartii acicularis (A. Férrusac, 1823)

Distribution of this subspecies is Pontic.

This subspecies is found in Slovakia and others areas.

References

Melanopsidae
Gastropods described in 1821
Taxa named by Florent Prévost